The CMLL Torneo Nacional de Parejas Increíbles (2019) or the National Incredible Pairs Tournament (2019) was a tag team Lucha Libre tournament held by the Mexican wrestling promotion Consejo Mundial de Lucha Libre (CMLL). The tournament is based on the Lucha Libre Parejas Increíbles match concept, which pairs two wrestlers of opposite allegiance, one portraying a villain, referred to as a "rudo" in Lucha Libre wrestling terminology, and one portraying a fan favorites, or "técnico".

The 2019 version of the tournament was the tenth year in a row that CMLL held the tournament since the first tournament in 2010. The winners are presented with a trophy but not given any other tangible reward for the victory. The team of Titán (tecnico) and Bárbaro Cavernario (rudo) defeated Volador Jr. and Último Guerrero in the finals of the tournament, after Volador Jr. hit Guerrero by accident, only for Último Guerrero to retaliate against Volador Jr., allowing the unified opponents to win the match.

History
The Mexican professional wrestling promotion Consejo Mundial de Lucha Libre (CMLL; "World Wrestling Council") held their first Torneo Nacional de Parejas Increíbles ("National Incredible Pairs Tournament") in 2010, from January 22 through February 5, marking the beginning of what became an annual tournament. CMLL has previous held Parejas Increíbles tournaments on an irregular basis and often promoted individual Parejas Increíbles and Relevos Increíbles ("Incredible Relay", with teams of three or more wrestlers). The  Parejas Increíbles concept is a long-standing tradition in lucha libre and is at times referred to as a "strange bedfellows" match in English speaking countries, because a Pareja Increible consists of a face (referred to as a técnico in Lucha Libre, or a "good guy") and a heel (a rudo, those that portray "the bad guys") teamed up for a specific match, or in this case for a tournament. The 2018 tournament was the ninth annual Parejas Increíbles tournament, and like its predecessors held as part of CMLL's regular Friday night CMLL Super Viernes ("Super Friday") shows.

Tournament background
The tournament featured 15 professional wrestling matches with different wrestlers teaming up, some of whom were involved in pre-existing scripted feuds or storylines while others were simply paired up for the tournament. For the Torneo Nacional de Parejas Increíbles tournaments, CMLL often teamed up a técnico (those that portray the "good guys" in wrestling, also known as faces) and a rudo (the "bad guy" or heels).  who are involved in a pre-existing storyline feud at the time of the tournament so that the tournament itself can be used as a storytelling device to help tell the story of escalating confrontations between two feuding wrestlers. The tournament format followed CMLL's traditional tournament formats, with two qualifying blocks of eight teams that competed during the first and second week of the tournament and a final match between the two block winners. The qualifying blocks were all one-fall matches while the tournament final was a best two-out-of-three-falls tag team match.

Tournament participants
Block A
Ángel de Oro   and La Bestia del Ring  
Blue Panther   and Máscara Año 2000  
Carístico   and Mephisto  
Flyer   and Forastero  
Guerrero Maya Jr.    and Euforia 
Soberano Jr.    and Sansón 
Titán    and Bárbaro Cavernario 
Tritón   and Rey Bucanero 
Block B
Atlantis   and Negro Casas 
Audaz   and Templario 
Místico    and El Cuatrero  
Niebla Roja    and El Terrible 
Rush   and Vangellys 
Stuka Jr.   and Hechicero 
Valiente   and Gran Guerrero 
Volador Jr.   and Último Guerrero

Tournament results
For the first block of the tournament, the eight tecnico participants started out by competing in a battle royal to determine the brackets for the matches that night. Carístico and Flyer were the first two to be eliminated, which meant that they would wrestle in the first actual tournament match. The winners of the match were Soberano Jr. and Tritón, earning them the longest rest of any of the competitors.  The team of Titán and Bárbaro Cavernario came to the ring wearing ring gear that was a mix of both wrestlers' normal style, Cavernario wore one of Titán's masks while Titán wore a leopard print singlet to show their unity. The teams of Carístico and Mephisto, Guerrero Maya Jr. and Euforia, Titán and Bárbaro Cavernario and finally Soberano Jr. and Sansón all qualified for the quarterfinals of the tournament. Carístico and Mephiston defeated Guerrero Maya Jr. and Euforia, while Titán and Bárbaro Cavernario defeated Soberano Jr. and Sansón to set up the semi-final match. The finals, which was also the longest match on the show, saw Titán and Bárbaro Cavernario win the match to qualify for the finals.

The other bracket of the tournament took place the following Friday night. For this block, it was the rudo competitors who participated in the seeding battle royal. Vangellys and Gran  Guerrero won the battle royal in 3:14 to earn the longest rest before their tournament match. In the first round Místico and El Cuatrero defeated Stuka Jr. and Hechicero, Atlantis and Negro Casas defeated Audaz and Templario, Último Guerrero and Volador Jr. defeated Niebla Roja and El Terrible, and finally Rush and Vangellys defeated Gran Guerrero and Valiente. The second round saw the teams of Último Guerrero and Volador Jr., and Rush and Vangellys qualify for the semi-final match. While Último Guerrero and Volador Jr. had often been on opposite sides over the years in CMLL, they worked together without any problems as they defeated Rush and Vangelly to earn the second spot in the finals the following week.

The final was the main event of CMLL's 63. Aniversario de Arena México show held on April 26. For the finals, the two teams faced off under best-two-out-of-three falls rules. Guerrero and Volador Jr. took the first fall, while Titán and Bárbaro Cavernario tied it up by winning the second fall shortly after. During the third fall, Volador Jr. accidentally kicked Último Guerrero when their opponent moved, which visibly upset Guerrero. Later when Volador Jr. dove onto an opponent on the floor Guerrero attacked his own partner, slamming him on the floor. The fall out between the two later resulted in Titán and Bárbaro Cavernario taking the third and final fall to win the tournament.

Tournament brackets

References

2019 in professional wrestling
CMLL Torneo Nacional de Parejas Increibles
Lucha libre